The 2003 UEFA Cup Final was played on 21 May 2003 between Celtic of Scotland and Porto of Portugal. Porto won the match 3–2 in extra time thanks to a goal from Derlei. This was also the first game to use the silver goal rule, although it did not affect the outcome of the game as Porto scored in the second half of extra-time, thus meaning the game had to be played until the end of extra-time.

Prior to this game, no club from Scotland or Portugal had ever won the UEFA Cup.

The game had what UEFA described at the time as "the largest travelling support to have assembled for a single game" – around 80,000 Celtic fans travelled to Seville for the final. For this turnout and the manner in which they conducted themselves, Celtic fans – dubbed "the Bhoys from Seville" – received an award from FIFA and UEFA, winning the FIFA Fair Play Award that year and being presented with a formal recognition from UEFA at a home match the following season.

Route to the final

Date, venue and officials
The game was played at Estadio Olímpico de Sevilla on 21 May with kick-off at 20:45 local time. A team of officials was selected from Slovakia.

Match

Summary

A rash challenge led to Joos Valgaeren of Celtic getting a yellow card in the eighth minute. After this it was a stoic affair, until 32 minutes into the first half when Capucho played in Deco, but he could do no more than fire his shot straight at Rab Douglas. Straight after this attack, Celtic broke on the counter with Henrik Larsson putting Didier Agathe through on the right but his cross was too high for Chris Sutton. Larsson had a chance to make it 1–0 in the 35th minute but was unable to get enough contact on the ball. Porto came close in the 41st minute when Deco moved past Bobo Baldé to go one on one with Douglas, who saved Deco's shot with his legs.

Porto found a way through on the stroke of half-time. After some great work from Deco, Dmitri Alenichev's shot was parried by Douglas and Derlei slotted the ball in to give Porto a 1–0 lead. It was his 11th goal of the competition. Porto's lead did not last long after the restart as Celtic equalised after 47 minutes when Larsson met Agathe's cross to direct a looping header in over the helpless Vítor Baía to get his tenth goal of the tournament and his 200th Celtic goal. Within five minutes, it was 2–1 when Deco evaded a tackle and slipped a through ball to Alenichev who converted the cross.

Three minutes later, Celtic levelled once again. Larsson took advantage of poor marking when he powerfully headed in Alan Thompson's corner. With Deco remaining a consistent threat, Martin O'Neill brought on Jackie McNamara in 76 minutes to nullify Deco's threat. In the 80th minute, Bobo Baldé picked up a yellow card. A couple of minutes from time, McNamara's errant pass found Alenichev, but he could not find the target and shot over.

Normal time ended with the game at 2–2. Extra time would be played under the silver goal rule, whereby the team leading at the end of the first half of extra time would win the match.

Celtic were down to ten men in the 96th minute when Baldé was dismissed after collecting his second yellow card. O'Neill reconfigured his team by moving McNamara back to fill the gap in defence caused by Baldé's dismissal.

The first half of extra time arrived without a change in the score, so the silver goal rule did not apply.

In the second half of extra time Celtic were unable to hold out for penalties, as Derlei reacted quickest to a Douglas block in the 115th minute and rounded McNamara to make it 3–2. Porto had Nuno Valente sent off in the last minute but no further goals meant that they had ended their 16-year wait for a further European trophy.

Details

Statistics

See also
2002–03 UEFA Cup
2003 UEFA Super Cup
Celtic F.C. in European football
FC Porto in international football competitions
History of Celtic F.C. (1994–present)
The Bhoys from Seville

References

External links
2002–03 season at UEFA.com

2
UEFA Cup Final 2003
UEFA Cup Final 2003
Sports competitions in Seville
UEFA Cup Finals
International club association football competitions hosted by Spain
UEFA
Final
May 2003 sports events in Europe
21st century in Seville